= Colonial America (disambiguation) =

Colonial America may refer to:

- The Colonial history of the United States
- The Thirteen Colonies of Britain in North America, which declared independence in 1776
- The European colonization of the Americas
